Paddy Corrigan (born 24 August 1944 in Kinnitty, County Offaly) is an Irish former hurler. He played for his local club Kinnitty and was a member of the Offaly senior inter-county team from 1983 until 1993.

References

1962 births
Living people
Kinnitty hurlers
Offaly inter-county hurlers
All-Ireland Senior Hurling Championship winners